The List of Wells Fargo presidents includes those persons who have served as President of Wells Fargo since 1852. It includes the presidents of the express mail company from 1852 to 1918 and of the Wells Fargo Bank, which was separated from the express company in 1905 and merged with the Nevada National Bank to form the Wells Fargo Nevada National Bank - the lineal ancestor of the present Wells Fargo Bank.

Presidents of Wells Fargo & Company Express
Edwin Barber Morgan 1852-1853
Danford N. Barney 1853-1866
Louis McLane 1866-1869
Ashbel H. Barney 1869-1870
William Fargo 1870-1872
Lloyd Tevis 1872-1892
John J. Valentine, Sr. 1892-1901
Dudley Evans 1902-1910
William Sproule 1910-1911
Burns D. Caldwell 1911-1918

Presidents of Wells Fargo Bank

Nevada Bank
Louis McLane 1875-1881
James Cair Flood 1881-1887
James Graham Fair 1887-1889
John William Mackay 1889-1891
Isaias W. Hellman 1891-1898

Nevada National Bank
Isaias W. Hellman 1898-1905

Wells Fargo Nevada National Bank
Isaias W. Hellman 1905-1920
Isaias W. Hellman Jr. 1920
Frederick L. Lipman 1920-1923

Wells Fargo Bank & Union Trust Company
Frederick L. Lipman 1924-1935
Robert Bruce Motherwell II 1935-1943
Isaias W. Hellman III 1943-1954

Wells Fargo Bank
Isaias W. Hellman III 1954-1960

Wells Fargo Bank American Trust Company
Ransom M. Cook 1960-1962

Wells Fargo Bank
Ransom M. Cook, 1962-1964
H. Stephen Chase, 1964-1966
Richard P. Cooley, 1966-1978
Carl E. Reichardt, 1978-1984
Paul Hazen, 1984-1995, 1997-1998
Richard Kovacevich, 1998-2007
John Stumpf, 2007-2016
Timothy J. Sloan, 2016-2019
C. Allen Parker (Interim), 2019-2019
Charles Scharf, 2019-present

References

See also
History of Wells Fargo
List of Wells Fargo directors

.01
.WF